Everett John "Sonny" Grandelius (April 16, 1929 – April 25, 2008) was an American football player, coach, announcer, and executive. He served as the head football coach at the University of Colorado at Boulder from 1959 to 1961, compiling a record  Grandelius played college football at Michigan State University from 1948 to 1950 and professionally in  the National Football League (NFL) with the New York Giants in 1953.

Playing career
Born in Muskegon Heights, Michigan, Grandelius attended Muskegon Heights High School, and is a 1987 inductee to the Muskegon Sports Hall of Fame. He led his team to back-to-back state championships in 1945 as a quarterback and in 1946 as a fullback when he was also selected as a first team All-State.

As a senior at Michigan State in 1950, he gained 184 rushing yards in the season opener, establishing a then school record. During his senior season, he gained 1,023 yards and 11 touchdowns on 163 attempts, the 17th back in NCAA history to rush for 1,000 yards or more in a season and the first at Michigan State. He was the leading scorer for the team and selected as the team's MVP. Grandelius also was an All-American, selected by three publications including the AP. As of 2006, he was ranked fourth in career average yards per carry at Michigan State (6.09, minimum of 150 attempts) and tied for tenth in rushing touchdowns for a single season (11). He had seven 100-yard rushing games in his career. He was the MVP of the 1951 Hula Bowl and also lettered in boxing his sophomore year.

100-yard rushing games

 1949 season
 October 1 • 11 carries for 104 yards vs. Marquette
 November 19 • 12 carries for 116 vs. Arizona

 1950 season
 September 23 • 24 carries for 184 vs. Oregon State
 October 7 • 14 carries for 110 vs. Maryland
 October 21 • 16 carries for 122 vs. Marquette
 October 28 • 21 carries for 114 vs. Notre Dame
 November 4 • 25 carries for 177 vs. Indiana

Drafted as the 11th pick in the third round (37th overall) of the 1951 NFL Draft, Grandelius played one season, in 1953, in the National Football League (NFL) for the New York Giants. He rushed 108 times for 278 yards with 1 touchdown and 3 fumbles and also had 15 receptions for 80 yards.

Coaching career
Grandelius became an assistant coach at his alma mater in 1954 under newly-promoted head coach Duffy Daugherty and stayed for five seasons, through 1958. He was hired as head coach at Colorado at age 29 in February 1959, succeeding recently fired Dallas Ward at a salary   the Buffaloes to controversial greatness, including a Big Eight Conference championship in 1961 and an Orange Bowl berth on New Year's Day.

Shortly after their bowl loss to LSU, it became rumor that he had been using a slush fund to pay between 15 and 30 top recruits and their families. The NCAA investigated and released inconclusive findings on April 27, 1962, which led to more controversy; the university regents had fired Grandelius six weeks earlier  Only one regent of the six, Charles Bromley, voted not to fire Grandelius, saying the firing "violated every principle of fair play since the Magna Carta."

The football team was also punished for two seasons by not allowing television coverage of games or be involved in any post-season bowl games. At least 20 players lost scholarships or left Colorado. News accounts at the time claimed that Grandelius was the first coach in the country fired for recruiting  Under interim head coach Bud Davis in 1962, the Buffaloes had a dismal 

After leaving Colorado, Grandelius went on to assistant coaching positions in the NFL with the Detroit Lions and Philadelphia Eagles.

Later life and death
Grandelius was a color commentator for Detroit Lions telecasts on CBS from 1965 to 1967. He was also the general manager for the Detroit Wheels of the World Football League (WFL) in 1974. Grandelius died on April 25, 2008 at age 79 in Beverly Hills, Michigan.
He also had a wife, Martha Grandelius and with her he had four children, Steven, Tammy, Kristin and Joel Grandelius. Along with being a loving father he also was a grandfather of five, Christopher Pendy, Andrew Pendy, Michael Pendy, Nick Grandelius and Grace Grandelius.

Head coaching record

Notes

References

External links
 

1929 births
2008 deaths
American football fullbacks
American football halfbacks
Colorado Buffaloes football coaches
Detroit Lions announcers
Detroit Lions coaches
Michigan State Spartans football coaches
Michigan State Spartans football players
National Football League announcers
NCAA sanctions
New York Giants players
World Football League executives
Philadelphia Eagles coaches
People from Muskegon Heights, Michigan
Coaches of American football from Michigan
Players of American football from Michigan